Robert Augustus Toombs (July 2, 1810 – December 15, 1885) was an American politician from Georgia, who was an important figure in the formation of the Confederacy. From a privileged background as a wealthy planter and slaveholder, Toombs embarked on a political career marked by effective oratory, although he also acquired a reputation for hard living, disheveled appearance, and irascibility. He was identified with Alexander H. Stephens's libertarian wing of secessionist opinion, and in contradistinction to the nationalist Jefferson Davis, Toombs believed a Civil War to be neither inevitable or winnable by the South.

Appointed as Secretary of State of the Confederacy (which lacked political parties) Toombs was against the decision to attack Fort Sumter, and resigned from Davis's cabinet. He was wounded at the Battle of Antietam, where he performed creditably. During the Battle of Columbus (1865), Toombs's reluctance to use canister shot on a mixture of Union and Confederate soldiers resulted in the loss of a key bridge in the war's final significant action. He avoided detention by traveling to Europe. On his return two years later, he declined to ask for a pardon, and successfully stood for election in Georgia when Congressional Reconstruction ended in 1877.

Early life and education
Born near Washington, Georgia in 1810, Robert Augustus Toombs was the fifth child of Catherine Huling and planter Robert Toombs. He was of English descent. His father died when he was five. After private education, Toombs entered Franklin College at the University of Georgia in Athens when he was fourteen. During his time at Franklin College, Toombs was a member of the Demosthenian Literary Society. After the university chastised Toombs for unbecoming conduct in a card-playing incident,
 he continued his education at Union College, in Schenectady, New York. He graduated there in 1828. He returned to the South to study law at the University of Virginia Law School in Charlottesville.

Marriage and family
Shortly after his admission to the Georgia bar, on November 18, 1830, Toombs married his childhood sweetheart, Martha Juliann ("Julia") DuBose (1813-1883), daughter of Ezekiel DuBose and his wife of Lincoln County, Georgia. They had three children. Lawrence Catlett (1831-1832) died of scarlet fever. Mary Louisa (1833-1855) married and died in childbirth, along with her baby. Sarah (Sallie) (1835-1866) married Dudley M. DuBose, a distant cousin. She died of complications of childbirth, together with her fifth child Julian.

Early legal and political career
Toombs was admitted to the Georgia bar and began his legal practice in 1830. He entered politics, gaining election to the Georgia House of Representatives, where he served in 1838. He failed to win re-election, but was elected again in the next term, serving 1840–41. He failed again to win re-election, but was elected in 1842, serving a third, non-successive term, 1843–1844.

Toombs won a seat in the United States House of Representatives in 1844, and would win re-election several times. He served several terms in the lower chamber until 1853. In 1852 the state legislature elected him to the US Senate. There Toombs joined his close friend and fellow representative Alexander H. Stephens from Crawfordville, Georgia. Their friendship became a powerful personal and political bond, and they effectively defined and articulated Georgia's position on national issues in the middle decades of the nineteenth century. Toombs, like Stephens, emerged as a states' rights partisan and became a national Whig. After that party dissolved, Toombs aided in the creation of the short-lived Constitutional Union Party in the early 1850s.

As did most Whigs, Toombs considered Texas to be the 28th state, but he opposed the Mexican–American War. Historian William Y. Thompson writes that Toombs was 
prepared to vote all necessary supplies to repel invasion. But he did not agree that the territory between the Nueces River and the Rio Grande was a part of Texas. He declared the movement of American forces to the Rio Grande at President Polk's command "was contrary to the laws of this country, a usurpation on the rights of this House, and an aggression on the rights of Mexico."

Slaveholdings

Toombs and his brother Gabriel owned large plantations and operated them using enslaved African Americans. Toombs increased his personal slave holdings as his wealth increased. Toombs owned six slaves in 1840. By 1850, he owned 17 slaves. In 1860, he owned 16 slaves at his Wilkes County plantation, and an additional 32 slaves at his 3,800-acre plantation in Stewart County, Georgia on the Chattahoochee River.

By 1860, Toombs and his wife lived without any other family members in Wilkes County; in the census that year, Toombs owned $200,000 in real estate; the value of his personal property, primarily made up of slaves, totaled $250,000. One of his slaves, Garland H. White, escaped just before the Civil War. He became a soldier and chaplain in the Union Army in 1862. Other slaves were freed by the Union Army as it occupied areas of Georgia. William Gaines and Wesley John Gaines (1840-1912), also former slaves of Toombs, both became church leaders.

From Unionist to Confederate
Throughout the 1840s and 1850s, Toombs fought to reconcile national policies with his personal and sectional interests. He had opposed the Annexation of Texas but vowed to defend the new state once it was annexed late in 1845. He also opposed the Mexican–American War, President Polk's Oregon policy, the Walker Tariff of 1846 and the Wilmot Proviso, first introduced in 1846. In common with Alexander H. Stephens and Howell Cobb, he defended Henry Clay's Compromise of 1850 against southerners who advocated secession from the Union as the only solution to sectional tensions over slavery. He denounced the Nashville Convention, opposed the secessionists in Georgia, and helped to frame the famous Georgia platform (1850). His position and that of Southern Unionists during the decade 1850–1860 was pragmatic; he thought secession was impractical.

Toombs supported expansion of slavery into the territories of California and New Mexico. He objected to the abolition of slavery in Washington, D.C. He took the view that the territories were the common property of all the people of the United States and that Congress must ensure equal treatment of both slaveholder and non-slaveholder. If the rights of the South were violated, Toombs declared, "Let discord reign forever."

From 1853 to 1861, Toombs served in the United States Senate. He reluctantly joined the Democratic Party when lack of interest among voters in other states doomed the Constitutional Union Party. Toombs favored the Kansas–Nebraska Act of 1854, the admission of Kansas as a slave state under the Lecompton Constitution, and the English Bill (1858). However, his faith in the resiliency and effectiveness of the national government to resolve sectional conflicts waned as the 1850s drew to a close.

Toombs was present on May 22, 1856, when Congressman Preston Brooks beat Senator Charles Sumner with a cane on the Senate floor.  As Brooks thrashed Sumner, his House allies Laurence M. Keitt and Henry A. Edmundson prevented witnesses from coming to Sumner's aid, with Keitt brandishing a pistol to keep them at bay.  Senator John J. Crittenden attempted to intervene, and pleaded with Brooks not to kill Sumner.  Toombs interceded for Crittenden, begging Keitt not to attack someone who was not a party to the Brooks-Sumner dispute. Later Toombs suggested that he had no issue with Brooks beating Sumner, and in fact approved of it.

On June 24, 1856, Toombs introduced the Toombs Bill, which proposed a constitutional convention in Kansas under conditions that were acknowledged by various anti-slavery leaders as fair. This marked the greatest concessions made by pro-slavery senators during the struggle over Kansas. But the bill did not provide for the submission of the proposed state constitution to popular vote, where, as the vote on the LeCompton Constitution showed, it would have been soundly defeated. The silence on this point of the territorial law, under which the Lecompton Constitution of Kansas was framed in 1857, was the crux of the Lecompton struggle.

Historian Thompson refers to Toombs as "hardly a man of the people with his wealth and imperious manner. But his handsome imposing appearance, undoubted ability, and boldness of speech appealed to Georgians, who kept him in national office until the Civil War brought him home." According to historian Jacob S. Clawson, he was "a bullish politician whose blend of acerbic wit, fiery demeanor, and political tact aroused the full spectrum of emotions from his constituents and colleagues....[he] could not balance his volatile personality with his otherwise keen political skill."

Secession 

In the presidential campaign of 1860, Toombs supported John C. Breckinridge. On December 22, soon after the election of Republican Abraham Lincoln, Toombs sent a telegram to Georgia that asserted that "secession by 4 March next should be thundered forth from the ballot-box by the united voice of Georgia." He delivered a farewell address in the US Senate (January 7, 1861) in which he said: "We want no negro equality, no negro citizenship; we want no negro race to degrade our own; and as one man [we] would meet you upon the border with the sword in one hand and the torch in the other." He returned to Georgia, and with Governor Joseph E. Brown led the fight for secession against Stephens and Herschel V. Johnson (1812–80). His influence was a powerful factor in inducing the "old-line Whigs" to support immediate secession.

Unlike the crises of 1850, these events galvanized Toombs and energized his ambitions for becoming the president of the new Confederate nation.

Confederacy
The selection of Jefferson Davis as the new nation's chief executive dashed Toombs's hopes of holding the high office of the fledgling Confederacy. He was rejected because of what Confederate leaders knew to be his serious drinking problem. Toombs had no diplomatic skills but Davis chose him as the Secretary of State. Toombs was the only member of Davis' administration to express dissent about the Confederacy's attack on Fort Sumter.

After reading Lincoln's letter to the governor of South Carolina, Toombs said to Davis: 
"Mr. President, at this time it is suicide, murder, and will lose us every friend at the North. You will wantonly strike a hornet's nest which extends from mountain to ocean, and legions now quiet will swarm out and sting us to death. It is unnecessary; it puts us in the wrong; it is fatal."

Army general
Within months of his cabinet appointment, a frustrated Toombs resigned to join the Confederate States Army. He was commissioned as a brigadier general on July 19, 1861, and served first as a brigade commander in the (Confederate) Army of the Potomac, and then in David R. Jones' division of the Army of Northern Virginia. He commanded troops through the Peninsula Campaign, Seven Days Battles, Northern Virginia Campaign, and Maryland Campaign. He was wounded in the hand at the Battle of Antietam, where he commanded the heroic defense of Burnside's Bridge.

Toombs resigned his CSA commission on March 3, 1863. He returned to Georgia, where he became Colonel of the 3rd Cavalry of the Georgia Militia. He subsequently served as a brigadier general and adjutant and inspector-general of General Gustavus W. Smith's division of Georgia militia. He strongly criticized Davis and the Confederate government, opposing conscription and the suspension of habeas corpus. Newspapers warned that he verged on treason. In the Battle of Columbus (1865), Toombs commanded the defense of the upper bridge.

When the war ended, Davis was arrested at Irwinville, Georgia, on May 10, 1865. On May 14, U.S. soldiers appeared at Toombs' home in Washington, Ga. and demanded his appearance. He escaped to Elbert county, where he was in the hands of friends, thence to Habersham county, and back through Elbert, Wilkes, Hancock, Washington, Wilkinson, Twiggs, Houston and Macon counties into Alabama, to Mobile, thence by boat to New Orleans and by steam to Havana and Europe. He reached Paris, France, early in July, 1865 along with P.G.T. Beauregard and Julia Colquitt, wife of another Confederate general. They were seeking to avoid arrest and trial as leaders of the Confederacy.

Final years
His beloved wife returned to Georgia in late 1866 following the death of their last surviving child, Sallie Toombs DuBose, in Washington County, Georgia. She went to help their widowed son-in-law care for several small children. Toombs missed his wife and returned to Georgia in 1867, but he refused to request a pardon from the president. He never regained his right to vote nor hold political office during the Reconstruction era.

However, Toombs restored his lucrative law practice, in connection with his son-in-law Dudley M. DuBose. The latter was elected in 1870 as a Democratic U.S. Representative and served one term. Toombs gradually resumed political power in Georgia. He funded and dominated the Georgia constitutional convention of 1877, in the year that federal troops were withdrawn from the South. He demonstrated the political skill and temperament that earlier had earned him a reputation as one of Georgia's most effective leaders. He gained a populist reputation for attacks on railroads and state investment in them.

Death and legacy

1883 was a year marked by losses for Toombs. After that, he sank into depression, alcoholism, and ultimately became blind. As March began, his son-in-law Dudley M. Dubose had a stroke and died. His long-time political ally, former Confederate Vice-president and Georgia Governor, Alexander H. Stephens, also died. By September, his beloved wife Julia died. Toombs died December 15, 1885. He was buried at Resthaven Cemetery in Wilkes County, Georgia with his wife, his daughter, and son-in-law. Toombs was survived by four grandchildren: Rev. Robert Toombs DeBose, Judge Dudley M. DuBose, Camilia DuBose, and Sally Lousia Toombs DuBose.

The Georgia Department of Natural Resources owns the house and land, Wilkes County, Georgia operates the Robert Toombs House in Washington. Georgia also erected a historical marker in Clarkesville, Habersham County, Georgia concerning the Toombs-Bleckly House, which Toombs acquired as a summer residence in 1879 and sold to Georgia Supreme Court justice Logan E. Bleckley five years later, although it burned down in 1897.

These locations were named for Robert Toombs:

Toombs County, Georgia is named for Robert Toombs.
Wilkin County, Minnesota was originally Toombs County.
 Toombs Judicial Circuit includes the superior courts of Glascock County, Lincoln County, McDuffie County, Taliaferro County, Warren County, and Wilkes County.
So is the Georgia town of Toomsboro, though with a slightly altered spelling. 
Camp Toombs in Toccoa, Georgia, was the training base of Easy Company, 506th Parachute Regiment during World War II and was named after him.
Robert Toombs Christian Academy , a segregation academy in Lyons, Georgia, is named in his honor.

In addition, two steamships were named for him. The Liberty Ship SS Robert Toombs was launched in 1943 by the Southeastern Shipbuilding Corporation and served through World War II and after, eventually being sold for scrap. The troop transport USS General LeRoy Eltinge (AP-154) was sold out of federal service to the Waterman Steamship Company and rebuilt as a long hatch general cargo ship in 1968. Renamed the SS Robert Toombs, she served with Waterman until being sold for scrap in 1980.

See also
 List of signers of the Georgia Ordinance of Secession
 Confederate States of America, causes of secession 
 "Died of states' rights"
 List of American Civil War generals (Confederate)
 Robert Toombs House

Notes

References
 Chesson, Michael. "Toombs, Robert Augustus"; American National Biography Online 2000
 Davis, William C., The Union That Shaped the Confederacy: Robert Toombs and Alexander H. Stephens. University Press of Kansas, 2001. Pp. xi, 284.
 Eicher, John H., and David J. Eicher, Civil War High Commands. Stanford: Stanford University Press, 2001. .
 Phillips, Ulrich B. The Life of Robert Toombs (1913),  a scholarly biography focused on his antebellum political career. online
 Scroggins, Mark.  Robert Toombs: The Civil Wars of a United States Senator and Confederate General (Jefferson McFarland, 2011)  242 pp.  online  review, scholarly biography
 Sifakis, Stewart. Who Was Who in the Civil War. New York: Facts On File, 1988. .
 Thompson, William Y. Robert Toombs of Georgia (1966), scholarly biography
 Warner, Ezra J. Generals in Gray: Lives of the Confederate Commanders. Baton Rouge: Louisiana State University Press, 1959. .

Primary sources
 Phillips, Ulrich B. "The Correspondence of Robert Toombs, Alexander H. Stephens, and Howell Cobb" in Annual Report of the American Historical Association, vol. 2 (1911). online 759 pp
 Toombs, Robert. "Letters to Julia Ann Dubose Toombs, 1850-1867". Digital Library of Georgia.

Further reading
 "Rebel Lion Redux", by Ray Chandler, Georgia Backroads, Summer 2008, pp. 19–23.

External links

Robert Toombs , New Georgia Encyclopedia
 Retrieved on 2008-02-13
The Life of Robert Toombs
 (Transcription of 1892 text)
Robert Toombs' Letters to Julia Ann Dubose Toombs, 1850-1867, Digital Library of Georgia
Daguerrotype of Robert Toombs, Richmond, Virginia, ca. 1854, taken by Jesse Whitehurst, at Digital Library of Georgia
Toombs-Bleckley House historical marker
Robert Augustus ″Bob″ Toombs (1810-1885) Find a Grave Memorial

 

1810 births
1885 deaths
19th-century American politicians
American planters
American politicians with disabilities
American slave owners
American blind people
Blind politicians
Burials in Georgia (U.S. state)
Confederate expatriates
Confederate militia generals
Confederate States Army brigadier generals
Executive members of the Cabinet of the Confederate States of America
Democratic Party United States senators from Georgia (U.S. state)
Deputies and delegates to the Provisional Congress of the Confederate States
Georgia (U.S. state) Constitutional Unionists
Democratic Party members of the Georgia House of Representatives
People from Wilkes County, Georgia
People of Georgia (U.S. state) in the American Civil War
Signers of the Confederate States Constitution
Signers of the Provisional Constitution of the Confederate States
Signers of the Georgia Ordinance of Secession
Union College (New York) alumni
University of Georgia people
Whig Party members of the United States House of Representatives from Georgia (U.S. state)
Whig Party United States senators
United States senators who owned slaves